Dominic Vinícius Eberechukwu Uzoukwu (born 5 January 1995), commonly known as Dominic Vinicius, is a Brazilian-born, Nigerian footballer who plays as a forward for China League One club Heilongjiang Ice City.

Career statistics

Club
.

Notes

References

1995 births
Living people
Brazilian footballers
Nigerian footballers
Brazilian expatriate footballers
Nigerian expatriate footballers
Association football forwards
Club Athletico Paranaense players
Cuiabá Esporte Clube players
Associação Portuguesa de Desportos players
Vejle Boldklub players
Beijing Sport University F.C. players
Danish 1st Division players
China League One players
Brazilian expatriate sportspeople in Denmark
Brazilian expatriate sportspeople in China
Nigerian expatriate sportspeople in Denmark
Nigerian expatriate sportspeople in China
Expatriate men's footballers in Denmark
Expatriate footballers in China
Brazilian people of Nigerian descent
Footballers from São Paulo